Samogitia or Žemaitija (Samogitian: Žemaitėjė; see below for alternative and historical names) is one of the five cultural regions of Lithuania and formerly one of the two core administrative divisions of the Grand Duchy of Lithuania alongside Lithuania proper. Žemaitija is located in northwestern Lithuania. Its largest city is Šiauliai. Žemaitija has a long and distinct cultural history, reflected in the existence of the Samogitian language.

Etymology and alternative names
Ruthenian sources mentioned the region as жемотьская земля, Žemot'skaja zemlja; this gave rise to its Polish form, and probably to the Middle High German . In Latin texts, the name is usually written as  etc. The area has long been known to its residents and to other Lithuanians exclusively as Žemaitija (the name Samogitia is no longer in use within Lithuania and has not been used for at least two centuries); Žemaitija means "lowlands" in Lithuanian.

Geography
Žemaitija is located in northwestern Lithuania in the territories of:
 Akmenė District Municipality
 Jurbarkas District Municipality
 Kelmė District Municipality
 Kretinga District Municipality
 Mažeikiai District Municipality
 Palanga city municipality
 Plungė District Municipality
 Raseiniai District Municipality
 Rietavas Municipality
 Šilalė District Municipality
 Skuodas District Municipality
 Tauragė District Municipality
 Telšiai District Municipality
 Šiauliai District Municipality

Eastern parts of:
 Klaipėda District Municipality
 Šilutė District Municipality

Western part of:
 Joniškis District Municipality
 Šiauliai city municipality.

The largest city is Šiauliai (Šiaulē). Telšiai (Telšē) is the capital, although Medininkai (now Varniai; Varnē) was once the capital of the Duchy of Samogitia.

The major cities are (the Samogitian language name, if different, is provided after slash):
 Šiauliai (Šiaulē) (101,514 inhabitants)
 Mažeikiai (Mažeikē) (32,477 inhabitants)
 Tauragė (Tauragie) (21,516 inhabitants)
 Telšiai (Telšē) (21,294 inhabitants) – considered capital
 Plungė (Plongė) (16,750 inhabitants)
 Kretinga (Kretinga) (16,580 inhabitants)
 Palanga (Palonga) (16,046 inhabitants)

Demographics and language

The people of Žemaitija speak Samogitian, a variety of Lithuanian that was previously considered one of three main dialects (modern linguists have determined that it is one of two dialects, the other being the Aukštaitian dialect and that both of these dialects have subdialects each).
Samogitian has northern and southern dialects, which are further subdivided. A western dialect once existed in the Klaipėda region, but it became extinct after World War II after its inhabitants fled the region as a result of being expelled or persecuted by the Soviet authorities.
During the 15th and 16th centuries, the Samogitians of the Klaipėda region called themselves "Lietuvininkai", whereas at the end of the 19th century when the area, known in German as the Memelland, was part of Prussia (Germany), they were known as "Prūsai." After World War II, the territory of the western subdialect was resettled mainly by northern and southern Žemaičiai and by other Lithuanians. Samogitian has a broken intonation ("laužtinė priegaidė", a variant of a start-firm accent) similar to that of the Latvian language. In 2010, the Samogitian language was assigned with an ISO 639-3 standard language code ("sgs"), as some languages, that were considered by ISO 639-2 to be dialects of one language, are now in ISO 639-3 in certain contexts considered to be individual languages themselves.

Žemaitija is one of the most ethnically homogeneous regions of the country, with an ethnic Lithuanian population exceeding 99.5% in some districts. During the first part of the 19th century, Žemaitija was a major center of Lithuanian culture (Žemaičiai traditionally tended to oppose any anti-Lithuanian restrictions). The local religion is predominantly Roman Catholic, although there are significant Lutheran minorities in the south.

The use of the Samogitian language is decreasing as more people tend to use Lithuanian, although there have been some minor attempts by local councils, especially in Telšiai, to write certain roadside information in Samogitian as well some schools teach children Samogitian in schools.

History

The modern concept of "dialectological" Žemaitija appeared only by the end of the 19th century. The territory of ancient Samogitia was much larger than current ethnographic or "dialectological" Žemaitija and embraced all of central and western Lithuania. 

The very term "Samogitians" is a Latinized form of the ancient Lithuanian name for the region's lowlanders, who dwelt in Central Lithuania's lowlands. The original subethnic Samogitia, i.e. Central Lithuania's flat burial grounds culture, was formed as early as the 5th-6th centuries. The western part of historical Žemaitija (before 12th–13th centuries it was inhabited by southern Semigallians and southern Curonians) became ethnically Lithuanian between the 13th and 16th centuries. The primal eastern boundary of historical Samogitia was the Šventoji River (a tributary of the Neris River); in 1387, the Lithuanian ruler (regent of Lithuania for Jogaila) Skirgaila had expanded the territory of Grand Duke's domain in Aukštaitija along the Nevėžis River at the expense of Žemaitija.

Because during the 13th through 16th centuries the Teutonic Order and the Livonian Order bordered Žemaitija, it was long threatened by their expansionist aims. As such, the Samogitian territory was offered to these orders, or exchanged in peace treaties, a number of times. Lithuania would then regain Žemaitija during subsequent conflicts.For more than two hundred years, old Samogitia played a central role in Lithuania's wars against the crusading order of the Teutonic Knights (Knights of the Cross and Knights of the Sword). Invasions started in Lithuania in 1229. Combined military forces undertook numerous campaigns against Samogitians and Lithuanians. Saule (1236), Skuodas (1259), Durbe (1260), Lievarde (1261) are just a few of the battles that took place.

Since Žemaitija was the last pagan region in Europe left to be invaded and christened, the Teutonic Order set their sights on this last mission. Between 1345 and 1382, the Knights of the Cross attacked from Prussia some 70 times, while the Livonian Knights of the Sword made 30 military forays. Year after year, fortresses were attacked, farms and crops were put to the torch, women and children enslaved and men killed. Despite all their effort, the Žemaičiai managed to defend their lands until 1410 decisive Battle of Grunwald or Žalgiris, where united Polish-Lithuanian forces defeated the Teutonic Order and ended their crusading era.In the 15th century, Žemaitija was the last region in Core Europe to be converted to Christianity. During the 15–18th centuries, it was known as the Duchy or Eldership of Žemaitija, which included some territories of what is now considered Aukštaitija and Suvalkija as well. The Duchy of Žemaitija was an autonomous administrative unit in the Grand Duchy of Lithuania with some similarities to a voivodeship. In contrast to some other areas of the Grand Duchy of Lithuania, the Lithuanian language was intensively used in the Duchy of Žemaitija and its nobility throughout the early modern period. This is proven by the letter of Stanisław Radziwiłł to his brother Mikołaj Krzysztof Radziwiłł immediately after becoming the Elder of Samogitia that: "While learning various languages, I forgot Lithuanian, and now I see, I have to go to school again, because that language, as I see, God willing, will be needed."After the partitions of the Polish–Lithuanian Commonwealth in the 18th century, Žemaitija was incorporated into the Russian Empire along with the rest of Lithuania. Žemaitija was the main source of the Lithuanian cultural revival during the 19th century and was a focal point for the smuggling of books printed in the Lithuanian language, which was banned by the occupying Russians.

In 1883, Edmund Veckenstedt published a book Die Mythen, Sagen und Legenden der Zamaiten (Litauer).

After World War I, Žemaitija became a part of the newly re-established Lithuanian state. The Žemaičiai resisted the Bolsheviks and the Bermontians. During World War II, Lithuania was first occupied by the Stalinist Soviet Union in 1940, then in 1941 by Nazi Germany, and in 1944 again by the USSR.  The Soviet Union recognized the independence of Lithuania on 6 September 1991. The last Soviet troops withdrew in August 1993.

In 1945, the Soviets denied the existence of the Lithuania Minor ethnographic region, out of political advantage, and declared the Klaipėda region a part of Žemaitija.

Tourism

Tourist destinations in Samogitia include Palanga, Kretinga and Žemaičių Kalvarija. The majority of tourists come from Latvia, Poland, Belarus, Russia, Germany, Spain, Finland and Sweden.Palanga is a tourist destination among tourists from the United Kingdom, Germany and Russia.

Žemaičių Kalvarija (or New Jerusalem as it used to be called) is visited by pilgrims from all around the world, due to its annual The Great Žemaičių Kalvarija Church Festival (usually in June or July).

Politics
Žemaitija historically was an autonomous region in the Grand Duchy of Lithuania, although it lost this status once Lithuania was annexed by the Russian Empire following the Third Partition of the Polish-Lithuanian Commonwealth in 1795 as a part of the Vilnius Governorate. In 1843, Žemaitija was incorporated into the Kaunas Governorate, with a minor part attached to the Courland Governorate. Since then, Žemaitija has not had separate political status, but there were attempts to create a separate state during the uprising in February 1831.

Currently, Žemaitija is represented by the Samogitian cultural society, a group interested in preserving Samogitian culture and language.

Symbols

The coat of arms depicts a black bear with silver claws and collar on a red shield topped with a crown. The greater arms are supported by a knight with a sword and a woman with an anchor, and has the motto Patria Una (Latin: One Fatherland). The current emblazonment of the arms was created by artist Algis Kliševičius.

The flag of Žemaitija depicts the coat of arms on a white background. It is a swallowtail flag. A variant of the flag charged with the greater coat of arms additionally has a red border around the flag.

Both symbols are assumed to have been used for centuries, especially the coat of arms (differing claims assert it was first used in the 14th or 16th centuries). The symbols were used by the Eldership of Žemaitija. These are the oldest symbols of the Lithuanian ethnographic regions. On 21 July 1994, these symbols were recognized by the government of Lithuania.

Because Žemaitija (Samogitia) does not correspond to any current administrative division of Lithuania, these symbols are not officially used anymore. However the Samogitian bear was used in the coats of arms of Šiauliai County and Telšiai County. It also appears on the arms of the city of Šiauliai.

Emblem of the Lithuanian Armed Forces Motorized Infantry Brigade Žemaitija (Samogitia) is the griffin with a sword in his right hand and a shield, which features the Samogitian bear, in his left hand.

Gallery

See also
 Žemaitija National Park
 Aukštaitija
 Telšiai Bernardine Monastery

References

Sources

External links

 Website of Samogitia

 
Lithuanian ethnographic regions
Historical regions in Lithuania